This is a list of English cricketers who played first-class cricket between the 1787 and 1825 seasons. The sport of cricket in this period had already acquired most of its modern features such as eleven-a-side, the three-stump wicket and the lbw law, although pitch preparation was rudimentary and play was largely dictated by the weather. The main difference was in bowling which was still mostly underarm, the key development of the period being the movement towards roundarm bowling which began in the late eighteenth century and was gathering pace by 1825.

The principal club throughout the period was Marylebone Cricket Club (MCC) which was founded in 1787. MCC organised the early Gentlemen v Players matches and most of the games played by occasional XIs such as those led by Colonel Lennox, Lord Frederick Beauclerk, George Osbaldeston and others. Inter-county cricket was rare during the Napoleonic Wars and there were no formally constituted county clubs at the time, but the main centres at county level were Berkshire, Essex, Hampshire, Kent, Middlesex, Surrey and Sussex. Towards the end of the period, Cambridge University became prominent, especially through its series of matches against the Cambridge Town Club. In the north of England, cricket was developing through town clubs which became the focal points of the game in their respective counties, especially Nottingham Cricket Club and Sheffield Cricket Club.

The players included are those known to have played in matches which were given retrospective first-class status between 1787 and 1825 inclusive.

A

B

C

D

E

F

G

H

I

J

K

L

M

N

O

P

Q

R

S

T

U

V

W

Y

See also
 List of English cricketers (1772–1786)
 List of English cricketers (1826–1840)
 List of English cricketers (1841–1850)
 List of English cricketers (1851–1860)
 List of English cricketers (1861–1870)
 The Cricketers of My Time by John Nyren, who played from 1787 to 1817

Notes

References
Note that CricketArchive is a subscription only website.

Bibliography
Britcher, Samuel (1790 to 1805; annuals). A list of all the principal Matches of Cricket that have been played (1790 to 1805) London: MCC.
Carlaw D (2020) Kent County Cricketers A to Z. Part One: 1806–1914 (revised edition). (Available online at the Association of Cricket Statisticians and Historians. Retrieved 2020-12-21.)
 

English cricketers 1787